Kornblum may refer to:

Science
Kornblum oxidation, chemical reaction of a primary halide with dimethyl sulfoxide (DMSO) to form an aldehyde
Kornblum–DeLaMare rearrangement, rearrangement reaction in which a primary or secondary organic peroxide is converted to the corresponding ketone and alcohol under base catalysis

People
Allan Kornblum (1938–2010), United States Magistrate Judge
Allan Kornblum (1949-2014), poet and independent publisher
John C. Kornblum (born 1943), former US Ambassador to Germany
Nathan Kornblum (1914-1993), organic chemist
Ronald Kornblum (1933-2008), American coroner

See also
Boris Korenblum (1923–2011), Soviet-Israeli-American mathematician

German-language surnames
Jewish surnames